Paul Reiser (born March 30, 1956) is an American actor, comedian, and television writer. He is known for his roles as Michael Taylor in the 1980s sitcom My Two Dads, Paul Buchman in the NBC sitcom Mad About You, Modell in the 1982 film Diner, Carter Burke in the 1986 film Aliens, and as Detective Jeffrey Friedman in Beverly Hills Cop (1984), Beverly Hills Cop II (1987), and Beverly Hills Cop: Axel Foley. More recently, he has gained recognition for his roles as Jim Neiman in the 2014 film Whiplash and Dr. Sam Owens in the Netflix series Stranger Things.

Reiser is ranked 77th on Comedy Central's 2004 list of the "100 Greatest Stand-ups of All Time". The name of his production company, Nuance Productions, is inspired by one of his lines in the film Diner, where his character explains his discomfort with the word "nuance".

Reiser is arguably best known for his role as greedy, slimy company man Carter Burke in James Cameron's Aliens, in which he went against his casting type and showcased his acting range. He appeared in the second and third seasons of The Kominsky Method as Martin, Mindy Kominsky's boyfriend.

Early life
Reiser was born in New York City in 1956, the son of Helen Hollinger Reiser (1919–2012), a homemaker who was one of the first women to graduate from Baruch College; and Samuel H. Reiser (1914–1989), a wholesale health food distributor who served in the military. His family is of Romanian Jewish descent. He has three sisters. He attended the East Side Hebrew Institute and graduated from Stuyvesant High School. He earned his bachelor's degree at Binghamton University, where he majored in music (piano, composition).

During his university years, Reiser was active in student theater productions at the Hinman Little Theater, an on-campus community theater organization in Hinman College, Reiser's dorm community. He found his calling as a comedian while performing in New York clubs during university summer breaks.

Career
After developing his skills as a stand-up comedian, Reiser had a breakout film role in 1982 when he appeared in Diner, a coming-of-age film directed by Barry Levinson. Reiser's character, Modell, a closet stand-up comedian, effectively brought Reiser's abilities to the attention of Hollywood. He followed this success playing a detective in Beverly Hills Cop (1984), a role he reprised in its sequel Beverly Hills Cop II (1987), and will play again in the upcoming Beverly Hills Cop: Axel Foley. Reiser also appeared in James Cameron's Aliens (1986), in which he played the villainous Carter Burke; and in The Marrying Man (1991) and Bye Bye Love (1995).

Reiser starred as one of two possible fathers of a teenage girl in the TV sitcom My Two Dads (1987–90), and later came to prominence in North America as Paul Buchman in Mad About You (1992–99), a comedy series he co-created, in which Helen Hunt co-starred as his on-screen wife. He was also the co-composer of the show's theme song, "The Final Frontier" (with Don Was), and performed the piano for the theme's recording. Reiser's role in Mad About You earned nominations for an Emmy, a Golden Globe, an American Comedy Award and a Screen Actors Guild Award for him. For the show's final season, Reiser and Hunt received $1 million ($ million today) per episode. After signing onto a Mad About You revival in 2018, it was picked up as a 12-episode limited series by Spectrum Originals in March 2019, which became available for members of Amazon Prime Video as of fall 2020.

In 2001, Reiser played a dramatic role as a man desperate to locate his biological mother, after learning he has a serious illness, in the British TV film My Beautiful Son. In 2002, Reiser made a guest appearance as himself on Larry David's HBO sitcom, Curb Your Enthusiasm. In the TV comedy film Atlanta (2007), Reiser appears as one half of a couple who, after meeting at a funeral, are unable to stay away from each other. In 2010, Reiser collaborated with the singer Julia Fordham to create a CD album titled Unusual Suspects, which includes the song "UnSung Hero", dedicated to American soldiers serving in Afghanistan. The two embarked on an acoustic tour after its release. Reiser also co-wrote the song, "No There There" with Melissa Manchester for her 2015 album, You Gotta Love the Life.  Early in his career, Reiser was the opening act for Manchester, who warned him that music audiences can be rough on comedians and that the last comedian that opened for her left the stage in tears. Reiser reflects about this warning and on how he then bombed at the Concord Hotel in the chapter "Don't Worry if They Suck" in I Killed: True Stories of the Road from America's Top Comics (2010), by Ritch Shydner and Mark Schiff.

Reiser scripted and starred in the semi-autobiographical comedy series The Paul Reiser Show, which aired on NBC as a mid-season replacement during the 2010–11 TV season. "This is nice", commented Reiser on the Stephanie Miller radio program, "because you get to sit around and root for other shows to fail." However, due to the lack of lead time and promotion by NBC prior to its debut (as well as poor scheduling), the low-rated show was canceled on April 22, 2011, with only two episodes aired. He co-created (but did not star in) the 2017 dramedy There's... Johnny!, set backstage at The Tonight Show with Johnny Carson in 1972. Originally created for Seeso, the seven-episode season was released on Hulu after Seeso's collapse. In recent years Reiser has appeared in films such as Whiplash and TV series such as Red Oaks and Stranger Things.

Reiser has written three books: Couplehood, about the ups and downs of being in a committed relationship; Babyhood, about his experiences as a first-time father; and Familyhood (released in May 2011), a collection of humorous essays. Couplehood is unique in that it starts on page 145; Reiser explained this as his method of giving the reader a false sense of accomplishment. In 1996, Reiser appeared on Late Show with David Letterman in the middle of writing Babyhood. Since he had not yet decided on a title, he presented a prop book, titled simply "Book" and with the same cover as that of Couplehood.

In 2022, Reiser appeared in season three of The Boys as The Legend.

Personal life
Reiser married Paula Ravets on August 21, 1988. They have two sons: born in 1995 and 2000. His oldest son has cerebral palsy, which Reiser has spoken about publicly at fundraisers and other events. Reiser is the cousin of screenwriter and producer Will Reiser, who is known for writing the semi-autobiographical comedy-drama film 50/50 (2011).

Reiser's first cousin is the legal scholar Richard Epstein.

Filmography

Film

Television

References

External links 

 

1956 births
20th-century American comedians
20th-century American male actors
21st-century American comedians
21st-century American male actors
21st-century American pianists
20th-century American male musicians
21st-century American male musicians
20th-century American male writers
21st-century American male writers
20th-century American pianists
Male actors from New York City
Alumni of Jewish day schools in the United States
East Side Hebrew Institute alumni
American comedy writers
American family and parenting writers
American male comedians
American male film actors
American male television actors
American mass media company founders
American relationships and sexuality writers
American male stage actors
American stand-up comedians
Television personalities from New York City
American television writers
American people of Romanian-Jewish descent
American male television writers
Binghamton University alumni
Jewish American male actors
Jewish American comedy writers
Jewish American songwriters
Jewish American writers
Living people
Musicians from New York City
Songwriters from New York (state)
Stuyvesant High School alumni
Writers from New York City
21st-century American poets
American male essayists
20th-century American essayists
21st-century American essayists
Comedians from New York City
Screenwriters from New York (state)
American male pianists
Jewish American male comedians
21st-century American Jews
American male songwriters